The Langley Marish Tournament  was a late Victorian era grass court tennis tournament established in 1880. It held in Langley Marish, Berkshire, England and ran through until 1885 when it was abolished.

History 
This tournament was first staged in August 1880. From 1882 until 1884 the tournament was staged at the Eaton Recreation Ground, Eaton, Berkshire. The inugural mens singles was won by Mr. C.O. Phipps. The 1882 edition was won by Mr. E. Montresor. The final two editions was won by Mr. Felix H.G. Palmer.

References

Defunct tennis tournaments in the United Kingdom
Grass court tennis tournaments